Mallomys is a genus of rodent in the family Muridae. The name of the genus is formed from the Greek μαλλός, mallos, wool, and μῦς, mus, mouse/rat. Little is known about their behavior, but they are believed to feed on leaves, grasses and other plant material.

It contains the following species:
 De Vis's woolly rat (Mallomys aroaensis)
 Alpine woolly rat (Mallomys gunung)
 Subalpine woolly rat (Mallomys istapantap)
 Rothschild's woolly rat (Mallomys rothschildi)
 Bosavi woolly rat (Mallomys sp. nov.)
 Arfak woolly rat (Mallomys sp. nov.)
 Foja woolly rat (Mallomys sp. nov.)

Conservation International (CI) and the Indonesia Institute of Science (LIPI) discovered two possibly undescribed mammals upon visit of the Foja Mountains in June 2007: a Cercartetus pygmy possum, one of the world's smallest marsupials, and a  Mallomys giant rat (five times the size of a Brown Rat) - found in Indonesia's Papua in 2005.

References

 
Rodent genera
Taxa named by Oldfield Thomas
Taxonomy articles created by Polbot
Rodents of New Guinea